The Samsung Alias (formerly known as the SCH-u740) was a cell phone made by Samsung. The phone was originally available in a champagne finish then black, with the dialing keys in grey in contrast to black keys. A subsequent relaunch under the "Alias" name was accompanied by the switch to a blue/silver color scheme with the dialing keys half white and half black instead of grey and black. It features a dual-hinge design that can be opened portrait or landscape style. In landscape mode it features a QWERTY keyboard and VCAST music on the Verizon Wireless network within Australia and the USA.

The phone runs on Verizon Wireless's digital and Ev-DO networks. It also is available within Canada on Bell Mobility's network.

The music format is WMA. Its external features are a small postage stamp sized front display, touch sensitive music control buttons and a 1.3-megapixel camera with flash. On the right side there is a speakerphone button and a microSD (Transflash) card slot. On the left, there is a hold button along with an up/down volume button and proprietary charger/data transfer port. Opened in portrait mode, a standard numerical dialing pad along with two soft keys, send and end keys, a camera button, a voice command button, and a circular four-point dial with an OK key in the center are all available. Opened horizontally, the full QWERTY keypad is usable and a simple button press allows switching between the various alphanumeric functions. A pair of stereo speakers are mounted on either side of the 2.2 inch screen. The u740 is compatible with all Verizon services, such as VCAST. It is also equipped with voice recognition, text message dictation, and two flash-based display themes, as well as the standard red Verizon Wireless themes.

Currently for the Bell Mobility service there is a firmware upgrade. The old version is called BG08, the new one is called AH31. The phone must be sent into the service department for the upgrade.

External links
Samsung FAQs for SCH-U740
SCH-u740 Verizon Wireless - mobile phones SAMSUNG
Verizon site
CNET editors' review
PC World - Samsung SCH-u740 
Samsung SCH-U740 Bell Mobility - Samsung u740

Samsung mobile phones
Mobile phones introduced in 2007